The Skidaway River is an  tidal river in the U.S. state of Georgia. It is located in Chatham County southeast of Savannah.  Its north end is at the Wilmington River, and it flows southwest from there through Skidaway Narrows to end at the Burnside River, which connects via the Vernon and Little Ogeechee rivers with Ossabaw Sound, an arm of the Atlantic Ocean.  The Skidaway River flows between Skidaway Island to the east and Dutch Island and Isle of Hope to the west. It is part of the Atlantic Intracoastal Waterway.

See also
List of rivers of Georgia

References 

USGS Hydrologic Unit Map - State of Georgia (1974)

Rivers of Georgia (U.S. state)
Rivers of Chatham County, Georgia